Legislative Assembly elections were held in the Indian state of Rajasthan in 1998. The incumbent ruling party Bharatiya Janata Party lost to the Indian National Congress.

Schedule

Results

Elected members

References

State Assembly elections in Rajasthan
Rajasthan